Scott Hutter (born August 11, 1997) is a professional gridiron football defensive back for the Edmonton Elks of the Canadian Football League (CFL). He played college football for Wilfrid Laurier. Hutter was drafted by the Elks in the sixth round of the 2019 CFL draft.

College career 
Scott played four seasons of U Sports football at Wilfrid Laurier for the Golden Hawks (2015-18). In his final season of collegiate football, he was named a OUA Second-Team All-Star. In total he played in 130 games accumulating 135.5 tackles, 6.5 quarterback sacks, 13 pass knockdowns, and 11 interceptions.

Professional career 
After being drafted 50th overall in the sixth round by the Edmonton Elks Hutter spent his first two seasons primarily playing on special teams. In those first two seasons he played in a total of 15 games and contributed with 16 special teams tackles. Starting in 2022 he began to feature more regularly on the defensive side of the ball. On October 14, 2022, Hutter and the Elks agreed to a two-year contract extension.

References

External Links 

 Edmonton Elks bio
 Wilfrid Laurier Golden Eagles bio

1997 births
Living people
Sportspeople from London, Ontario
Wilfrid Laurier Golden Hawks football players
Edmonton Elks players
Canadian football defensive backs